

Open (vacated) seats won by another party's candidate (or an independent candidate)

Notes

References 

2019 United Kingdom general election
Lists of British MPs who were defeated by election